Ian Finlay may refer to:
 Ian Finlay (art historian) (1906–1995), Scottish art historian and museum director
 Ian Finlay (cricketer) (born 1946), English cricketer
 Ian Hamilton Finlay (1925–2006), Scottish poet, writer, artist and gardener